Carl Herman Dorner (December 22, 1837 – August 13, 1911) was a member of the Wisconsin State Assembly.

Biography
Dorner was born on December 22, 1837 in what is now Hamburg, Germany. He attended the University of Jena and Leipzig University.

From 1871 to 1875, Dorner directed the Zoological Garden of Hamburg. He later helped layout and organize the Cincinnati Zoo and Botanical Garden. Dorner went on to join the faculty of the German-English Academy in Milwaukee, Wisconsin, eventually becoming its principal.

Dorner died on August 13, 1911 at his daughter's summer home in Okauchee Lake. He was buried in Milwaukee.

Political career
Dorner was a member of the Assembly for Milwaukee County's Fourth District from 1908 until his death. Additionally, he was a member of the Milwaukee County Board of Supervisors from 1904 to 1908. He was a Republican.

References

External links

Politicians from Hamburg
Politicians from Milwaukee
Republican Party members of the Wisconsin State Assembly
County supervisors in Wisconsin
American school principals
Schoolteachers from Wisconsin
University of Jena alumni
Leipzig University alumni
1837 births
1911 deaths
Burials in Wisconsin
19th-century American politicians